Preben Lerdorff Rye (23 May 1917 – 15 June 1995) was a Danish film actor. He appeared in 92 films between 1941 and 1989. He was born and died in Denmark.

Selected filmography 

 The Child (1940) – Jurastuderende
 En ganske almindelig pige (1940) – Toves kollega
  (1941) – Tjener Alfred Olsen
 Afsporet (1942) – Willy Hansen
 Vredens dag (1943) – Martin (Absalon's son from first marriage) (uncredited)
  (1945) – Styrmand Andersen
 De røde enge (1945) – Alf
  (1946) – Morten Just
  (1946) – Tømrermester Eriksen
 Brevet fra afdøde (1946) – Skuespiller
  (1947) – Aage Larsen
  (1947) – Reinald
 Støt står den danske sømand (1948) – 1. Styrmand på Marie Grubbe
  (1948) – Egelev
 Hr. Petit (1948) – Detektiven
  (1948) – Et bud
 Det gælder os alle (1949) – Chauffør Olsen
 Kampen mod uretten (1949) – Opsynsmand Hansen
 Vi vil ha' et barn (1949) – Hendes ven
  (1949) – Nattevagt (uncredited)
  (1950) – Terningspiller
  (1950) – Sømanden
  (1950) – Værle
 I gabestokken (1950) – Revisor Sejr
  (1951) – Johan
 Frihed forpligter (1951)
  (1951) – Henning Knudsen
  (1951) – Carlo Pedersen
  (1952) – Johansen
 The Crime of Tove Andersen (1953) – Kriminalbetjent Knudsen
 Adam og Eva (1953) – Indbrudstyv
 Sønnen (1953) – Generalen
  (1954) – Høvedsmand
  (1954) – Henrik Larsen
 Ordet (1955) – Johannes Borgen (uncredited)
  (1955) – Martin
  (1955) – Gangster
  (1955) – Forfatter Donner
 Hvad vil De ha'? (1956) – Sømand
  (1956) – Arthur Blume
  (1956) – Gårdejer Thorkild Andersen
 Ingen tid til kærtegn (1957) – Erik's far
  (1957) – David
 Sønnen fra Amerika (1957) – En arbejder
  (1957) – Hans
  (1957) – Fyrmester Larsen
 Hvor går Karl hen? (1957)
  (1957) – Magister Carolus Lieberg
  (1958) – Axel von Bramfeldt
  (1958) – Mads
 Vagabonderne på Bakkegården (1958) – Jonas
  (1959) – Han
  (1960) – Hipomand
 Skibet er ladet med (1960) – Skipper på Jupiter
  (1961) – Hr. Christensen
 Hans Nielsen Hauge (1961) – Kong Frederik VI
 Paradis retur (1964) – Skuespiller
  (1964) – Philip Michaelsen
  (1966) – Mikael
 Der var engang (1966) – Første junker
  (1968)
  (1971) – Vandringsmanden
  (1972) – Jens Larsen
 The First Circle (1973) – Professor Chelnov
 Nitten røde roser (1974) – Holger Hjort
  (1976) – Regnar Lodbrog
 Strømer (1976) – Fessor
  (1977) – Tigger
  (1978) – Skuespiller
  (1979) – Davids far
 Next Stop Paradise (1980) – Hjalmar Krog
  (1980)
  (1982) – Læge Bruun
 The Element of Crime (1984) – Grandfather
 Babettes gæstebud (1987) – Captain
 Hip Hip Hurrah! (1987) – Blinde Christian
  (1987) – Filmoperatøren
 Isolde (1989) – Ældre mand (ægtepar)
 Christian (1989) – Grandfather

References

External links 
 

1917 births
1995 deaths
20th-century Danish male actors
Best Actor Bodil Award winners
Danish male film actors
People from Langeland Municipality
Best Supporting Actor Bodil Award winners